The Oginski Canal is a canal in Belarus which connects  Yaselda River and Shchara River. Its length is 54 km. Its construction was started in 1765 by prince Michał Kazimierz Ogiński.

References

Canals in Belarus
Canals opened in 1783